Events in the year 1912 in Bulgaria.

Incumbents

Events 

 The First Balkan War began.

References 

 
1910s in Bulgaria
Years of the 20th century in Bulgaria
Bulgaria
Bulgaria